Bryce Huff (born April 17, 1998) is an American football defensive end for the New York Jets of the National Football League (NFL). He played college football at Memphis.

Early life and high school
Huff grew up in Opelika, Alabama , where he spent most of his childhood. He later moved to Mobile, Alabama, where he attended St. Paul's Episcopal School. As a senior, He was named first-team All-State after recording 93 tackles and seven sacks. Huff initially committed to play college football at South Alabama, but flipped his commitment to Memphis.

College career
Huff played mostly on special teams as a true freshman. He entered the pass rush rotation as a sophomore, making three starts and finishing the season with 30 tackles, five tackles for loss and two sacks. As a junior, Huff recorded 49 tackles and led the team with 9.5 sacks and 19 tackles for loss and was named second-team All-American Athletic Conference (AAC). He again led the Tigers with 6.5 sacks and 15.5 tackles for a loss and was named second-team All-AAC.

Professional career

Huff signed with the New York Jets as an undrafted free agent on May 6, 2020, shortly after the conclusion of the 2020 NFL Draft. He was announced as part of the Jets' initial 53-man roster on September 5, 2020. Huff made his NFL debut on September 27, 2020, against the Indianapolis Colts, batting down a pass in a 36-17 loss.
In Week 6 against the Miami Dolphins, Huff recorded his first career sack on Ryan Fitzpatrick during the 24–0 loss.

Huff entered the 2021 season as a starting linebacker for the Jets. He started the first six games before being placed on injured reserve on November 4, 2021, with a back injury. He was activated on December 18.

Huff entered the 2023 offseason as a restricted free agent, and the Jets placed a second-round tender on him on March 15, 2023.

References

External links
Memphis Tigers bio

Living people
Players of American football from Alabama
Sportspeople from Mobile, Alabama
American football linebackers
Memphis Tigers football players
New York Jets players
1998 births